Ahmed Husain (born 11 January 1999) is a Bahraini handball player for Al Tadamon and the Bahraini national team.

He represented Bahrain at the 2019 World Men's Handball Championship.

References

1999 births
Living people
Bahraini male handball players
21st-century Bahraini people